Dance of Death is the thirteenth studio album by English heavy metal band Iron Maiden, released first in Japan on 2 September and then 8 September 2003 in the rest of the world excluding North America (where it was released a day later). The album was an analogue recording.

Their second studio release since the return of vocalist Bruce Dickinson and guitarist Adrian Smith in 1999, the album features the band's first-ever fully acoustic track, "Journeyman", as well as "New Frontier", their only song co-written by drummer Nicko McBrain. As with Brave New World, its predecessor in 2000, the record was produced by Kevin Shirley, who has worked with Iron Maiden on all subsequent releases.

Background
The band first confirmed that they would be working on a follow-up to 2000's Brave New World with producer Kevin Shirley on 27 November 2002, announced alongside a small set of European tour dates for the following year. On 6 January 2003, Shirley confirmed via his website that the band would begin recording that month, followed by the announcement that the basic tracks had been completed on 5 February and that the release was to be mixed in April. On 31 May, the band announced that the album, recorded at Sarm West Studios, would be entitled Dance of Death, after which the release date was issued on 17 June.

The band undertook the Dance of Death World Tour in support of the album, which included many theatrical elements inspired by the record's songs. During "Dance of Death", Bruce Dickinson would wear theatrical masks and a cape while moving around the stage; at the end he would dress as the Grim Reaper for the final chorus. During "Paschendale", Dickinson would wear a traditional British Infantryman trench coat and helmet (although he revealed in the Death on the Road documentary that it was actually Hungarian), as worn during World War I, and the set would be decorated with barbed wire. The tour led to a live album and DVD, entitled Death on the Road, released in 2005 and 2006.

The album was released as a DVD-Audio disc in 2004, including 5.1 mixes of each song.

Songs

Dance of Death is the only Iron Maiden album to date in which drummer Nicko McBrain has a songwriting credit, having co-written "New Frontier". This also makes it the only Iron Maiden album to date in which every member of the band receives a songwriting credit. The song expresses McBrain's views on human cloning. McBrain, a born-again Christian, explained that "I personally believe that God created man and it's only God's right to create a human being because only He can give you a soul. When man attempts to make man then it's a monster in a test tube." 

"Montségur" was based on the fall of the Cathar stronghold of the same name, which fell in the aftermath of the Albigensian Crusade in 1244. Dickinson, who wrote the song's lyrics, states, "There is so much great stuff and so many great stories throughout history that you can make parallels with the modern day – particularly when history repeats itself as often as it does – that it makes for some very colourful subject matter."

"Paschendale" is about the Battle of Passchendaele which took place during the First World War. It was written by Adrian Smith, who usually contributes to the band's shorter, more commercial-sounding songs, but decided to write what he describes as "a traditional Maiden epic". It features strong progressive rock elements, including its length, detailed structure, and multiple tempo changes throughout the song. Dickinson comments, "the beauty of 'Paschendale' isn't in the epic-ness of the song – although you have to admit it is a powerful and stirring body of music – but the detail." In live performances, Dickinson introduces the song with a passage from Wilfred Owen's "Anthem for Doomed Youth".

According to guitarist Janick Gers, the album's title track was inspired by the final scene of Ingmar Bergman's The Seventh Seal, at the end of which "these figures on the horizon start doing a little jig, which is the dance of death". Gers wrote most of the music and explained the concept to Steve Harris, who wrote the lyrics and most of the melodies.

"Face in the Sand" is based on the media coverage surrounding the Iraq War, taking place as the album was being recorded. Dickinson explains, "I remember thinking about the desert sands as an image and how it moves and shifts with time. Specifically what I was thinking was that whatever empires you tend to build – whether they are British, American, Iraqi or whatever, they'll all crumble and fade away into something else. So, to my mind at least, the best thing you can hope for, if you were to leave anything behind, is just an imprint in the sand." The song is notable for being the first and only Iron Maiden track in which McBrain uses a double bass pedal.

The final track, "Journeyman", is Iron Maiden's first and to date only fully acoustic song. According to Dickinson on the Death on the Road live album, it is about "the whole process of writing and being a musician", although Mick Wall describes it as "a wistful tale of carpe diem". The song was originally recorded with electric instruments, however, as Dickinson states, "after all the battering that we've given the listener over the last hour of music it just seemed right to play out with something totally unexpected and left field." The original version appears on the No More Lies EP.

Artwork

The computer-generated cover art was provided by David Patchett, who asked for his name to be removed from the album's credits after the band decided to use an unfinished version.  The album cover was received negatively by both fans and critics, being cited on several "worst of" lists. Dickinson later called the cover "embarrassing".

The original cover art supposedly featured only Eddie and a few monks behind him but the band manager Rod Smallwood felt it looked empty, so he hired someone from IronMaiden.com to design characters surrounding Eddie using the program Poser. They then gave the roughs back to Patchett and asked him to work on the skin and mask textures. Patchett did so but was unimpressed with the result.

Reception

Reviews for the album were generally positive with Kerrang! describing it as "stupendous stuff and concrete proof that Maiden are as electrifying and important as they have been in a long time". Sputnikmusic were also positive about the album, giving special mention to "Paschendale", described as "quite easily the ultimate Maiden masterpiece". Although deeming the first three songs "refreshing yet unremarkable", AllMusic describes Dance of Death as "a triumphant return to form for these heavy metal legends."

Although criticising the album for its length and for not "matching the quality" of its predecessor, Brave New World, PopMatters praised the band for being able to "still easily outclass most of the younger nu-metal bands today".

Track listing

Personnel
Production and performance credits are adapted from the album liner notes.

Iron Maiden
Bruce Dickinson – vocals
Steve Harris – bass, keyboards, co-producer
Dave Murray – lead & rhythm guitars
Janick Gers – lead & rhythm guitars
Adrian Smith – rhythm & lead guitars
Nicko McBrain – drums

Production
Kevin Shirley – producer, engineer, mixing
Drew Griffiths – engineer
Brad Spence – assistant engineer
Tim Young – mastering
Dave Patchett – sleeve illustration (uncredited)
Simon Fowler – photography
Rod Smallwood – management
Andy Taylor – management
Merck Mercuriadis – management

Notes

Charts

Weekly charts

Year-end charts

Certifications

References

Iron Maiden albums
2003 albums
EMI Records albums
Albums produced by Kevin Shirley
Death in music